Demochkin is a rural locality (a khutor) in Mikhaylovka Urban Okrug, Volgograd Oblast, Russia. The population was 63 as of 2010. There are 11 streets.

Geography 
Demochkin is located 36 km southwest of Mikhaylovka. Kurin is the nearest rural locality.

References 

Rural localities in Mikhaylovka urban okrug